Samir Shakir Mahmoud Sumayda'ie (Samir Sumaidaie) is an Iraqi politician and was the Iraqi ambassador to the United States. He was born in Baghdad in 1944 and left Iraq in 1960 to study in the United Kingdom where he obtained a degree in  electrical engineering from Durham University in 1965 and a postgraduate diploma in 1966. He returned to Iraq in 1966 but left again for the UK in 1973 after Saddam Hussein seized power. He returned to Baghdad and was appointed member of the Iraq Governing Council in July 2003. He was appointed as Iraq's Ambassador to the United States in April 2006, after previously serving as the Iraq's Permanent Representative to the United Nations (from August 2004), and prior to that, as Baghdad's Interior Minister. He is secular and rejects any sectarian label.

During his years of exile, based in London, and traveling in the Mid- and Far- East, He was a leading figure in the opposition to Saddam's regime and helped form a number of political groups.

In July 2005 Sumaidaie demanded an inquiry into the fatal shooting (which he has described as "cold-blooded") of his cousin during a routine house to house search by US Marines in Iraq.

In November 2007 he visited The Fletcher School at Tufts University where he gave a speech on the history and current situation in Iraq.

In March 2010 he visited the renowned Elliott School of International Affairs at The George Washington University

References

External links

 
 The Washington Diplomat Newspaper - Ambassador profile 
 Official bio
  BBC News: Iraq envoy accuses US of killing, July 2005
 CNN interview with Sumaidaie: Marines shot my cousin, May 2006

1944 births
Living people
People from Baghdad
Alumni of Durham University
Iraqi diplomats
Government ministers of Iraq
Ambassadors of Iraq to the United States
Permanent Representatives of Iraq to the United Nations
Interior ministers of Iraq